PGA Tour Golf II is a sports video game developed by American studio Polygon Games and published by EA Sports for Sega Genesis in 1992 and Time Warner Interactive for Game Gear in 1995.

Playable courses
The game features the courses of TPC at Avenel, TPC at Sawgrass, TPC at Southwind, TPC of Scottsdale, TPC at Eagle Trace, and PGA West Stadium.

Playable characters
The Game Gear version features 4 professional golfers as playable or as CPU opponents: Paul Azinger, Craig Stadler, Fuzzy Zoeller and Fred Couples. The Genesis version features an additional 6 professional golfers (for a total of 10): Tommy Armour III, Bruce Lietzke, Mark McCumber, Mark O'Meara, Larry Mize and Joey Sindelar.

Reception
The Mega Drive version knocked Ecco the Dolphin from the top of the charts in the UK. MegaTech gave the game 94% and a Hyper Game award, praising the number of features and the control method. Computer Gaming World in July 1994 said that the Macintosh version's graphics were not as good as Links but much better than the PC version's. Citing its emphasis on simulation, the magazine concluded that "Unlike many sequels, this actually adds to the genre". Reviewing the Game Gear version, GamePro praised the screen layout, controls, and detailed graphics, but criticized the long loading times, weak sound effects, and music.

References

External links
 
 

1992 video games
EA Sports games
Game Gear games
Golf video games
Sega Genesis games
Video games developed in the United States
Video games scored by David Lowe